The 1924 Marquette Golden Avalanche football team was an American football team that represented Marquette University as an independent during the 1924 college football season. In its third season under head coach Frank Murray, the team compiled a 5–2 record.

Schedule

References

Marquette
Marquette Golden Avalanche football seasons
Marquette Golden Avalanche football